Mount Baldy is a mountain located in the Kananaskis River valley alongside Highway 40 in the Canadian Rockies.

During World War II, prisoners in a nearby internment camp were occasionally permitted to make the ascent of Mt. Baldy as long as they promised to return. A University of Calgary research centre now occupies the former location of the camp.

Up until 1984, when it was given its current day official name, it was commonly referred to as Barrier Mountain, due to its proximity to Barrier Lake.

Photos

References

External links

Mount Baldy scramble description

Baldy, Mount
Kananaskis Improvement District
Alberta's Rockies